The 2008 National Football League was the Gaelic football league contested by 33 GAA counties' football teams, 32 from Ireland and one (London) from England.

Derry won their sixth title.

Format
The 2008 format of the National Football League is a new system consisting of four separate divisions. There are eight teams in the top three divisions and nine in Division Four. Placings are decided by:
Points (2 for a win, 1 for a draw, 0 for a loss)
Score difference
Total scored
Head-to-head result between tied teams
The top two in each division play a final match to decide the division champions. The top two in divisions 2, 3 and 4 are promoted, whilst the bottom two in 1, 2 and 3 are relegated.

Division One

Table

Matches

Final

Division Two

Table

Final

Division Three

Table

Final

Division Four

Table

Final

References

External links
 2008 Fixtures

National Football League
National Football League (Ireland) seasons